Boone is a town in and the county seat of Watauga County, North Carolina, United States.  Located in the Blue Ridge Mountains of western North Carolina, Boone is the home of Appalachian State University and the headquarters for the disaster and medical relief organization Samaritan's Purse.  The population was 19,092 at the 2020 census.

The town is named for famous American pioneer and explorer Daniel Boone, and every summer from 1952 has hosted an outdoor amphitheatre drama, Horn in the West, portraying the British settlement of the area during the American Revolutionary War and featuring the contributions of its namesake.  It is the largest community and the economic hub of the seven-county region of Western North Carolina known as the High Country.

History
 Boone took its name from the famous pioneer and explorer Daniel Boone, who on several occasions camped at a site generally agreed to be within the present city limits. Daniel's nephews, Jesse and Jonathan (sons of brother Israel Boone), were members of the town's first church, Three Forks Baptist, still in existence today.
Boone was served by the narrow gauge East Tennessee and Western North Carolina Railroad (nicknamed "Tweetsie") until the flood of 1940.  The flood washed away much of the tracks and it was decided not to replace them.

Boone is the home of Appalachian State University, a constituent member of the University of North Carolina.
Appalachian State is the sixth-largest university in the seventeen-campus system.
Caldwell Community College & Technical Institute also operates a satellite campus in Boone.

"Horn in the West" is a dramatization of the life and times of the early settlers of the mountain area. It features Daniel Boone as one of its characters, and has been performed in an outdoor amphitheater near the town every summer since 1952, except for when COVID-19 necessitated canceling the 2020 performances. 
The original actor in the role of "Daniel Boone" was Ned Austin. His "Hollywood Star" stands on a pedestal on King Street in downtown Boone.  He was followed in the role by Glenn Causey, who portrayed the rugged frontiersman for 41 years, and whose image is still seen in many of the depictions of Boone featured in the area today.

Boone is notable for being home to the Junaluska community. Located in the hills just north of Downtown Boone, a free black community has existed in the area since before the Civil War. Although integration in the mid-20th century led to many of the businesses in the neighborhood closing in favor of their downtown counterparts, descendants of the original inhabitants still live in the neighborhood. Junaluska is also home to one of the few majority-African American Mennonite Brethren congregations.

Boone is a center for bluegrass musicians and Appalachian storytellers. Notable artists associated with Boone include the late Grammy Award-winning bluegrass guitar player Doc Watson, and the late guitarist Michael Houser, one of the founding members of and the lead guitarist for the band Widespread Panic, as well as Old Crow Medicine Show, The Blue Rags, and Eric Church, all who are Boone natives.

The Blair Farm, Daniel Boone Hotel, Jones House, John Smith Miller House, and US Post Office-Boone are listed on the National Register of Historic Places.

Geography and climate
Boone is located at  (36.211364, −81.668657) and has an elevation of 3,333 feet (1015.9 m) above sea level. An earlier survey gave the elevation as 3,332 ft and since then it has been published as having an elevation of 3,333 ft (1,016 m). Boone has the highest elevation of any town of its size (over 10,000 population) east of the Mississippi River. Compared to the lower elevations of the Carolinas, winters are long and cold, with frequent sleet and snowfall. Blizzard-like conditions are not unusual during many winters.

Demographics

2020 census

As of the 2020 United States census, there were 19,092 people, 5,905 households, and 1,641 families residing in the town.

2000 census
As of the census of 2000, there were 13,472 people, 4,374 households, and 1,237 families residing in the town. The population density was 2,307.0 people per square mile (890.7/km). There were 4,748 housing units at an average density of 813.0 per square mile (313.9/km). The racial makeup of the town was 93.98% White, 3.42% Black or African American, 0.30% Native American, 1.19% Asian, 0.05% Pacific Islander, 0.46% from other races, and 0.60% from two or more races. 1.64% of the population were Hispanic or Latino of any race.

There were 4,374 households, out of which 9.6% had children under the age of 18 living with them, 21.0% were married couples living together, 5.6% had a female householder with no husband present, and 71.7% were non-families. 38.4% of all households were made up of individuals, and 7.3% had someone living alone who was 65 years of age or older. The average household size was 1.97 and the average family size was 2.63.

In the town, the population was spread out, with 5.8% under 18, 65.9% from 18 to 24, 12.1% from 25 to 44, 9.1% from 45 to 64, and 7.1% who were 65 or older. The median age was 21 years.  For every 100 females, there are 95.6 males. For every 100 females age 18 and over, there were 94.7 males.

The median income for a household in the town was $20,541, and the median income for a family was $49,762. The per capita income was $12,256. Males had a median income of $28,060 versus $20,000 for females.  About 9.2% of families and 37.0% of the population were below the poverty line, including 6.3% of those under the age of 18 and 9.1% of those 65 and older.

Media

Newspaper
Boone is mainly served by three local newspapers:

 The Watauga Democrat is published on Wednesdays and Sundays.
 The Mountain Times (free weekly entertainment publication).
 The High Country Press (daily online news publication).

A smaller newspaper, The Appalachian, is Appalachian State University's campus newspaper; it is published once a week on Thursdays. In addition to the locally printed papers, a monthly entertainment pamphlet named Kraut Creek Revival has limited circulation and is funded by a Denver, NC-based newspaper.

Radio
 WATA-AM 1450 AM is a local news talk information radio station.
 WATA-FM 96.5 FM is an alternate frequency of 1450 AM.
 WZJS 100.7 FM is a classic hits radio station.
 WMMY 106.1 FM is a country music radio station, broadcasting the same as 102.3 ("Highway 106.1/102.3").
 WWMY 102.3 FM is a country music radio station, broadcasting the same as 106.1 ("Highway 106.1/102.3").
 WECR 1130 AM is an adult contemporary music radio station ("Star").
 WXIT 1200 AM is a top 40/contemporary hits radio station ("Pulse Boone").
 WASU 90.5 FM is a college radio station from the Appalachian State University.
 WNCW 92.9 FM is a noncommercial NPR-affiliate public radio station licensed to Isothermal Community College.
 W261CK 100.1 FM is a local translator for WFDD 88.1 FM, a noncommercial NPR-affiliate public radio station from Wake Forest University.

Law and government
Boone operates under a mayor–council government.  The city council consists of five members.  The mayor presides over the council and casts a vote on issues only in the event of a tie.  , the Town Council members were: Mayor Tim Futrelle, and Councilors: Edie Tugman (Mayor Pro-Tem), Todd Carter, Virginia Roseman, Jon Dalton George, Rebecca Nenow.

Development
Industrial, commercial, and residential development in the town of Boone is a controversial issue due to its location in the mountains of Appalachia.  On October 16, 2009, the town council accepted the "Boone 2030 Land Use Plan." While the document itself is not in any way actual law, it is used by the town council, board of adjustment, and other committees to guide decision making as to what types of development are appropriate.

In 2009, the North Carolina Department of Transportation began widening 1.1 miles of U.S. 421 (King Street) to a 4-to-6-lane divided highway with a raised concrete median from U.S. 321 (Hardin Street) to east of N.C. 194 (Jefferson Road), including a new entrance and exit to the new Watauga High School, at a cost of $16.2 million. The widening has displaced 25 businesses and 63 residences east of historic downtown King Street. The project was slated to be completed by December 31, 2011, but construction continued into the spring of 2012.

Sports
Boone is home to the Appalachian State Mountaineers which field varsity teams in 17 sports, 7 for men and 10 for women. Appalachian State's football program has been successful with the Mountaineers winning three straight national championships in 2005, 2006, and 2007, the only team in North Carolina, public or private, to win an NCAA national championship in football.

Aside from college sports, Boone also has local baseball and soccer teams. The Boone Bigfoots were formed in 2021 and now compete in the Coastal Plain League, a wood-bat collegiate summer baseball league. The Bigfoots play their home games at Beaver Field at Jim and Bettie Smith Stadium.  Boone's entry in the National Premier Soccer League is Appalachian FC which began play in March 2021 and play home games at ASU Soccer Stadium in the Ted Mackorell Soccer Complex.

Points of interest
 Appalachian State University
 Blue Ridge Parkway
 Daniel Boone Native Gardens
 Horn in the West
 Howard Knob
 Tweetsie Railroad
 Watauga River
 Elk Knob State Park
 Grandfather Mountain
Kidd-Brewer Stadium

Notable people

Sam Adams, professional golfer who played on the PGA Tour
Chris Austin, country music singer
Eustace Conway, an American naturalist
Bertha Cook, needlework artist (native of nearby Sands)
Rufus L. Edmisten, former North Carolina Secretary of State and Attorney General
Tommy Gregg, former MLB player
Steve Goss, former North Carolina Senator and ordained Southern Baptist minister
Doc Hendley, founder of Wine to Water, an American charitable organization
John Hollar, former NFL player for the Washington Redskins and Detroit Lions
James Holshouser, was the 68th Governor of North Carolina
Michael Houser, founding member and lead guitarist of the band Widespread Panic
Ken Isaacs, executive with the Christian organization Samaritan's Purse
Ryder Jones, MLB player with the Arizona Diamondbacks
Bob Matheson, former NFL player and two-time Super Bowl champion with the Miami Dolphins
Abraham Morlu, former CFL player and track Olympian, representing his birth country Liberia
Stanley South, major proponent of the processual archaeology movement
Brenda Taylor, Olympic hurdler who represented the Team USA at the 2004 Athens Olympics
Coaker Triplett, former MLB player for the Chicago Cubs, St. Louis Cardinals, and Philadelphia Phillies
Doc Watson, bluegrass, gospel, blues, folk, and country singer

Sister city
Boone has one sister city, as designated by Sister Cities International:
 Collingwood, Ontario, Canada

References

External links
 
 
 DigitalNC: Historic Boone 
 Historical Boone Photos, Postcards, and Paper
 Cy Crumley ET&WNC Photo Collection

 
County seats in North Carolina
Towns in Watauga County, North Carolina
Western North Carolina
Populated places established in 1872
1872 establishments in North Carolina
Appalachian culture in North Carolina
Towns in North Carolina